Ehara is a town and commune in Madagascar. It belongs to the district of Benenitra, which is a part of Atsimo-Andrefana Region. The population of the commune was estimated to be approximately 5,000 in 2001 commune census.

Only primary schooling is available. The majority 60% of the population of the commune are farmers, while an additional 35% receives their livelihood from raising livestock. The most important crop is rice, while other important products are sugarcane and cassava. Services provide employment for 5% of the population.

Geography
Ehara is situated at the Sakamare, near its mouth in the Onilahy River.

References and notes 

Populated places in Atsimo-Andrefana